= Ann O'Leary (psychologist) =

American psychologist

Ann O'Leary is an American behavioral psychologist, associated with the Centers for Disease Control and Prevention in Atlanta, Georgia. She specializes in behavior associated with AIDS. O'Leary received her PhD from Stanford University. In 2002, the American Psychological Association's Committee on Psychology and AIDS gave her their Distinguished Leader Award. In addition, O'Leary has completed research alongside Charles J. Neighbors, a fellow psychologist, around the concept of "condom negotiation". The results of their studies has since been incorporated into HIV, and sexual violence, prevention programs.

== Books ==
- O'Leary, Ann; Jemmott, Loretta Sweet (1995), Women at Risk: Issues in the Primary Prevention of AIDS, Springer-Verlag, ISBN 978-0-306-45041-9.
- O'Leary, Ann; Jemmott, Loretta Sweet (1996), Women and AIDS: Coping and Care, Springer-Verlag, ISBN 978-0-306-45258-1.
- O'Leary, Ann (2002), Beyond Condoms: Alternative Approaches to HIV Prevention, Springer-Verlag, ISBN 978-0-306-46731-8.
- Koenig, Linda J.; Doll, Lynda S.; O'Leary, Ann; et al., eds. (2003), From Child Sexual Abuse to Adult Sexual Risk: Trauma, Revictimization, and Intervention, American Psychological Association, ISBN 978-1-59147-030-4.
- A. O'Leary, D. Purcell, R. H. Remien &C. Gomez (2010). Childhood sexual abuse and sexual transmission risk behaviour among HIV-positive men who have sex with men. Centers for Disease Control and Prevention, Columbia University & University of California, San Francisco, USA. Childhood sexual abuse and sexual transmission risk behaviour among HIV-positive men who have sex with men (article).
